The following are the association football events of the year 1884 throughout the world.

Events

Clubs founded in 1884

England
Nantwich Town F.C.
Derby County F.C.
Leicester City F.C.
Lincoln City F.C.
Prescot Cables F.C.
Tranmere Rovers F.C.
Wakefield F.C.

Scotland
Stenhousemuir F.C.

Domestic cups

International tournaments
1883–84 British Home Championship (26 January – 29 March 1884)

Births
 1 January – José Quirante (d. 1964), Spanish midfielder and coach associated with both FC Barcelona and Real Madrid.
 April – Billy Bradshaw (d. unknown), England international half-back in four matches (1910–1913).
 3 May – Willie Reid (d. 1966), Scotland international forward in nine matches (1911–1914), scoring four goals.
 31 May – Frank Bradshaw (d. 1962), England international forward in one match (1908), scoring three goals and so one of the five England players to score a hat-trick on his only international appearance.
 6 June – Tim Williamson (d. 1943), England international goalkeeper in seven matches (1905–1913).
 23 June – Val Harris (d. 1963), Ireland international in twenty matches (1906–1914); club career with Shelbourne and Everton.
 28 July - Jan Košek (d. 1927), Bohemian international forward in 3 matches scoring 4 goals (1906-1908); club career mainly with Slavia Prague, scoring 819 goals in 302 games. 
 12 October – Jock Rutherford (d. 1963), England international forward in eleven matches (1904–1908), scoring three goals.
 8 December – Wilf Low (d. 1933), Scotland international half-back in five matches (1911–1920).

References

 
Association football by year